Francis Baylie (also variously spelt Bayley or Bailey) was a shipbuilder based in Bristol, England, during the 17th century, a well established merchant shipbuilder who also built warships for the English Royal Navy.

History

Origins
The yard is one of the oldest named shipbuilders in Bristol, as Lloyd's of London did not publish their lists before 1764, and Statutory Registers did not begin until 1786. The oldest known Baylie built ship is the 280 ton (bm) merchantman Charles of 1626. Francis Baylie's first recorded navy orders resulted from Parliament approval on 28 September 1652 for a fourth rate during the Commonwealth of England period. Baylie's later attracted several other orders for warships in the mid-1650s.

Shipyard
Baylie's shipyard was located in The Marsh, now predominantly laid out as the Georgian Queen Square, at an area known as 'The Gibb' or 'Gibb Taylor', a point of land which used to extend from Narrow Quay at Prince Street on the River Frome. Building had already been undertaken here since at least the 16th century, as the Frome had been diverted in 1240-47, resulting in additional invaluable land outside the city walls. Baylie's yard was at the southwest corner of the quay extended by Thomas Wright of the Society of Merchant Venturers in 1627.

When the third rate Edgar was completed in 1669 she was the biggest ship yet built in Bristol, and in Samuel Pepys diary, the Admiralty administrator talks of visiting the ship and tipping the cabin boys. She had suffered damage during the launch as the fall was too great, leading to three broken lowermost ways and damage amidships. The Speedwell, built at 'Gib Taylour' and assumed to be Baylie's, also had an unfortunate launching on 1 November 1663 when four boys and men on board drowned during the process.

Closure

Francis Baylie died in 1678. No further ship builds are recorded after the large  ship of the line Northumberland was completed, and it is likely the yard closed soon afterwards. Gibb Taylor itself continued to see shipbuilding until the early 18th century, when it was closed in order to extend the quays and provide additional wharves for cargo.

Ships built by Francis Baylie

Naval

Known naval ships built by Francis Baylie
Islip (1654). 22-gun sixth rate ship
Nantwich (1655). 40-gun fourth rate frigate
St Patrick (1666). 50-gun fourth rate frigate
Edgar (1668). 70-gun third rate ship of the line
Oxford (1674). 54-gun third rate frigate
Northumberland (1679). 70-gun third rate ship of the line

Merchant

Known merchant ships built by Francis Baylie
Charles (1626). 280 t merchantman
Speedwell (1663). merchantman

References

Defunct shipbuilding companies of the United Kingdom
Businesspeople from Bristol
17th-century births
1678 deaths